Croatia is a European Parliament constituency for elections in the European Union covering the member state of Croatia. It is currently represented by eleven Members of the European Parliament. Members are elected by proportional representation using open lists.

Members of the European Parliament

Election results

Elected Members of the European Parliament from Croatia for 2013–2014 (by party list)

Elected Members of the European Parliament from Croatia for 2014–2019 (by party list)

Elected Members of the European Parliament from Croatia for 2019–2024 (by party list)

Elections

2013

The 2013 election was the first European election for Croatia.

2014

The 2014 European election was the eighth election to the European Parliament and the second for Croatia.

2019

The 2019 European election was the ninth election to the European Parliament and the third for Croatia.

See also
 List of observers to the European Parliament for Croatia, 2012–13

References

European Parliament constituencies
2013 establishments in Croatia
Constituencies established in 2013
European Parliament elections in Croatia